Belli Lalitha (29 April 1974 – 26 May 1999) was an Indian folk singer and founder of Telangana Kala Samithi who was murdered in 1999.

Life
She was born in Nancharpet, Atmakur Mandali, Nalgonda district in a Telugu-speaking Kuruma family. She had a brother, Belli Krishna, an activist and a government employee and 5 sisters. She was active in the civil liberties movement and an activist for statehood for Telangana region in the late 1990s. Her father was an Oggu Katha singer and a labourer. She was fighting for the cause of Telangana statehood and was immensely popular in rural areas. She was offered a seat by Samajwadi Party in 1999 elections from Bhongir constituency before she was killed.

Death
In 1999, she was kidnapped, assaulted, and hacked with an axe to the point her body parts were dismembered into 17 pieces. Her dismembered body parts were then thrown in front of the Choutupoal police station by the assailants. Initially, the then TDP government home minister Alimineti Madhava Reddy was implicated in the murder but later cleared after further evidence pointed to local Naxalite godfather and kingpin Mohammed Nayeemuddin. Three of her brothers were also killed, the remaining brother Krishna hiding from 2000 to 2017.

References

Further reading

Indian women folk singers
Indian folk singers
People from Nalgonda district
1999 deaths
People murdered in India
Indian murder victims
Crime in Telangana
1974 births
Women musicians from Andhra Pradesh
Singers from Andhra Pradesh
20th-century Indian women singers
20th-century Indian singers